Shona Ballinger (born 14 June 1970) is a former rugby union player. She made her debut for the Black Ferns at RugbyFest 1990 against a World XV's team on 1 September at Christchurch. She was named in the 1991 Women's Rugby World Cup squad, but did not get to play in the World Cup officially.

References 

1970 births
Living people
New Zealand female rugby union players
New Zealand women's international rugby union players